Hector Suppici Sedes (1903-1948) was an Uruguayan racecar driver. The first winner of the Grand Prix of the South, he was also a skilled mechanic and was known for his many innovations in racing technique and racecar management. 

He was born in Montevideo, the cousin of Alberto Suppici, who later became the first football manager to win the FIFA World Cup. He was known in his neighbourhood of La Blanqueada as "El gaucho" and "El inventor". He had notable success as a professional driver, winning the Uruguayan National Grand Prix four times and also the Buenos Aires-Mendoza race in 1935. In 1938, he had his greatest triumph, winning the Southern Grand Prix (El Gran Premio del Sur), which covered all of Patagonia. Suppici covered the 6,224 kilometers in 60 hours 49 minutes and 37 seconds, at an average of 90.436 kilometers per hour. 

His contemporaries were drivers such as Juan Manuel Fangio, “Hipomenes” Angel Lo Valvo, “El indio rubio” Arturo Kruuse, the Gálvez brothers and Raúl Riganti. He was also a friend of intellectuals and writers such as Juan José Morosoli (author of "Journey to the Sea") and Julio César Castro (aka Juceca, the creator of Don Verídico). Pintín Castellanos composed and dedicated the milonga “Meta fierro” to him, which Juan D'Arienzo recorded in 1939.

On the afternoon of December 4, 1948, he crashed his car in the Chilean town of Victoria, in the Atacama desert, while he was driving in the second stage of the Lima-Buenos Aires race. He was 45 years old. 

He was commemorated in an Uruguayan postage stamp in 1973.

References

Uruguayan racing drivers
1903 births
1948 deaths